Yolanda Kakabadse Navarro (born 1948) is an Ecuadorian conservationist of Georgian descent.

Biography 

After studies in Educational psychology at the University of Quito, she became involved in environmental issues. She was a founder of the Fundación Natura in Quito and was its executive director from 1979 to 1990. At the Rio Earth Summit, she acted as NGO liaison. In 1993, she was a founder of the Fundación Futuro Latinoamericano (www.ffla.net) and served until 2006 as the executive president of this NGO. From August 1998 to January 2000, she served as Minister of Environment in the government of Ecuador.

From 1996 to 2004, she was president of the International Union for Conservation of Nature (IUCN) and from 2010 to 2017, she was president of the World Wide Fund for Nature (WWF). She is also a member of Washington D.C. based think tank the Inter-American Dialogue.

Yolanda Kakabadse is also a trustee of the Ford Foundation and was a board member of the LafargeHolcim Foundation for Sustainable Construction from 2004 until 2013.

Since 2017, Yolanda is the Chair of an IUCN-led Independent Scientific and Technical Advisory Panel, the Rio Doce Panel, created to advise the restoration efforts at the Rio Doce watershed in Brazil, following the Mariana dam disaster, in 2015. 

Kakabadse is an Earth Charter International Commission member.

References 

1948 births
Ecuadorian people of Georgian descent
Living people
Conservationists
Presidents of the International Union for Conservation of Nature
Members of the Inter-American Dialogue